Eric Harris (22 August 1909 – death unknown), also known by the nickname of "Toowoomba Ghost", was an Australian professional rugby league footballer who played in the 1920s and 1930s.

Playing career

Championship final appearances
Harris played  in Leeds' 2–8 defeat by Hunslet in the Championship Final during the 1937–38 season at Elland Road, Leeds on Saturday 30 April 1938.

County Cup Final appearances
Harris played  in Leeds' 14–8 victory over Huddersfield in the 1937–38 Yorkshire County Cup Final during the 1937–38 season at Belle Vue, Wakefield on Saturday 30 October 1937.

Records and legacy
Harris holds a number of try scoring records at Leeds, including most tries scored in a season (63), and highest career total of tries with the club (392).

Harris also jointly holds Leeds' "Tries In A Match" record, with eight tries scored against Bradford Northern. His sequence of 36 tries in 17 consecutive matches for Leeds is a joint record in British rugby league, equalled only by Luke Briscoe for Featherstone Rovers in 2018.

In 2019, Harris was inducted into the Leeds Rhinos Hall of Fame.

Outside rugby league
During the summer, 1936-38, Eric Harris played baseball for NBA team Leeds Oaks.

Eric Harris became a teacher at the new Carnegie Physical Training College in Leeds, married a lady from Leeds, but returned to Australia at the start of World War II.

References

External links

1909 births
Australian rugby league players
British Empire rugby league team players
Leeds Rhinos players
Place of death missing
Queensland Rugby League State of Origin coaches
Queensland rugby league team players
Rugby league wingers
Rugby league players from Toowoomba
Wests Panthers players
Year of death missing